James Anderson may refer to:

Arts
James Anderson (American actor) (1921–1969), American actor
James Anderson (author) (1936–2007), British mystery writer
James Anderson (English actor) (born 1980), British actor
James Anderson (filmmaker) (1902–1960), American film director
James Anderson (songwriter) (1825–1899), Tyneside songwriter
James Anderson (writer), American television writer
James Arthur Anderson (born 1955), American writer
James McConnell Anderson (1907–1998), American painter and potter
Big Dad Ritch (James Richard Anderson), lead vocalist for American heavy metal band Texas Hippie Coalition
James Robertson Anderson (1811–1895), Scottish actor

Government
James Anderson (British politician) (1800–1864), Lord Provost of Glasgow and British MP for Stirling
James Anderson (Manitoba politician) (1903–1983), Canadian politician
James Drummond Anderson (1886–1968), Financial Commissioner of the Punjab
James Drummond Anderson (1852–1920), member of the Indian Civil Service
James H. Anderson (politician) (1878–1936), Lieutenant Governor of Delaware in the 1920s
James Hodson Anderson (1909–1996), Nebraska Attorney General
James Lee Anderson (born 1948), American politician in the Wyoming Senate
James Sibree Anderson (1841–1927), Scottish-born Wisconsin politician
James Thomas Milton Anderson (1878–1946), Canadian politician; Premier of Saskatchewan, 1929–1934

Military
James Anderson (defense official), acting Under Secretary of Defense for Policy
James Anderson Jr. (1947–1967), USMC, Vietnam War Medal of Honor recipient
James Anderson (Royal Navy officer) (1765–1835)
James Anderson (Medal of Honor) (1849–1918), American Indian Wars soldier
James Patton Anderson (1822–1872), Confederate Army general

Science
James A. Anderson (cognitive scientist) (born 1940), American professor of cognitive science and brain science at Brown University
James A. D. W. Anderson (born 1958), British computer scientist
James Anderson (biomedical engineer), American professor of pathology, macromolecular science and biomedical engineering at Case Western Reserve University
James Anderson (botanical collector) (1797–1842), Scottish botanical collector who later became the Superintendent of the Sydney Botanic Gardens
James Anderson (botanist) (1739–1809), Scottish botanist
James Anderson (civil engineer) (1793–1861), Scottish civil engineer
James Anderson (mechanical engineer) (1871–1945), Scottish mechanical engineer
James B. Anderson (1935–2021), American professor of chemistry and physics at Penn State University
James D. Anderson (1930–1976), American herpetologist
James G. Anderson (born 1944), American professor of atmospheric chemistry at Harvard University
James H. Anderson (computer scientist), American computer scientist
James M. Anderson (scientist), American scientist
Sir James Anderson, 1st Baronet (1792–1861), Irish inventor

Sports
James Allan Anderson (chess player) (1906–1991), American chess player
James Anderson (American football) (born 1983), American football linebacker
James Anderson (badminton) (born 1974), English badminton player
James Anderson (basketball) (born 1989), American basketball player
Duncan Anderson (James Duncan Anderson, born 1931), Australian amateur Australian rules footballer and cricketer for Oxford University
James Anderson (cricketer) (born 1982), English international cricketer
James Anderson (Australian cricketer) (1889–1951), Australian cricketer for the Queensland representative team
James Anderson (footballer), Scottish footballer
Jamie Anderson (golfer) (James Anderson, 1842–1905), Scottish golfer
Jim Anderson (swimmer) (James Allan Anderson, born 1963), British Paralympic swimmer
James Anderson (tennis) (1894–1973), Australian tennis player
James Oswald Anderson (1872–1932), sportsman in Argentina

Other
James A. Anderson (academic administrator), chancellor of Fayetteville State University
James Anderson (explorer), Hudson's Bay Company executive after whom the Anderson River (Northwest Territories) was named
James Anderson (Freemason) (1679/80–1739), Church of Scotland minister, author and Freemason
James Anderson (lawyer) (1662–1728), Scottish lawyer
James Anderson (missionary) (fl. 1865–1870), Protestant Christian missionary
James Anderson of Hermiston (1739–1808), Scottish Enlightenment agriculturalist, lawyer, inventor, economist, writer, publisher
James Anderson (sea captain) (1824–1893), captain of SS Great Eastern laying transatlantic telegraph cable
James Anderson (trade unionist) (died 1917), British trade union leader
James Craig Anderson (1963–2011), American murder victim
James M. Anderson (hospital executive), American hospital executive
James R. Anderson (1864–1913), lawyer in South Australia

See also
Jim Anderson (disambiguation)
Jamie Anderson (disambiguation)
Jimmy Anderson (disambiguation)
James Andersen (disambiguation)